The women's 800 metre freestyle competition at the 2022 Mediterranean Games was held on 2 July 2022 at the Aquatic Center of the Olympic Complex in Bir El Djir.

Records
Prior to this competition, the existing world and Mediterranean Games records were as follows:

Results
The final was held at 19:15.

References

Women's 800 metre freestyle
2022 in women's swimming